Mademoiselle Fifi is a collection of short stories by Guy de Maupassant published in 1882. The stories are:
"Mademoiselle Fifi"
"The Practical Joker"
"The Door"
"The Hair"
"Our Letters"
"Queen Hortense"
"Moonlight"
"The Father"
"The Coup d'État"
"Bed Twenty-Nine"
"The Jewels"
"The Baby"
"The Umbrella"
"The Family Circle"
"A Question of Latin"
"A Sign"
"Sound the Alarm"
"Clochette"
"The Legend of St Michael's Mount"
"Mademoiselle Cocotte"
"Forgiveness"
"My Twenty-five Days"
"Horrible"
"Boule de Suif"
"Finished"

External links 
 
Free audiobook: entire works of Guy de Maupassant (in French)

1882 short story collections
French short story collections
Short story collections by Guy de Maupassant